Contour rivalry is an artistic technique used to create multiple possible visual interpretations of an image. An image may be viewed as depicting one thing when viewed in a certain way; but if the image is flipped or turned, the same lines that formed the previous image now make up an entirely new design.

This technique was widely practiced by the artists of the Chavín culture of the central Andes about two thousand years ago. An example of this technique from the Chavín is the Raimondi Stela.

References

See also
 List of art media
 List of artistic media
 List of art movements
 List of art techniques
 List of most expensive paintings
 List of most expensive sculptures
 List of sculptors
 Optical illusion
 Rotational symmetry
 Three hares
 Triquetra
 Triskelion

Artistic techniques
Optical illusions
Binocular rivalry